Smith and Jones may refer to:

Smith (surname) and Jones (surname)
Smith & Jones instant noodles, a brand of instant noodles manufactured and sold in India by Capital Foods Ltd India.

It also may refer to the following television programs:
Alias Smith and Jones, an American Western television series
Alas Smith and Jones, a British television sketch comedy show
"Smith and Jones" (Doctor Who), an episode of the British television series  Doctor Who

In fiction, the use of Smith and Jones as a pair of characters is sometimes used to convey a sense of intentional anonymity, as in the cases:
Agent Smith and Agent Jones from The Matrix
In the film Men in Black, Will Smith and Tommy Lee Jones portrayed two agents referred to as "Mr. Smith" and "Mr. Jones" in some promotional material